Antonio Aldonza Lobato, known as Aldonza (21 January 1926 – 11 April 2014) was a Spanish professional footballer who played as a left back.

Career
Born in Leioa, Aldonza played for Arenas Club, Athletic Bilbao and Real Sociedad.

References

1926 births
2014 deaths
Spanish footballers
Arenas Club de Getxo footballers
Athletic Bilbao footballers
Real Sociedad footballers
La Liga players
Association football fullbacks